The Short Film Golden Bear is the most important award in the short film competition of the Berlin International Film Festival.

Awards

External links

Berlinale website

Golden Bear Short Film
 Winners
Short film awards